Fountainbleau is an unincorporated community in Andrew County, in the U.S. state of Missouri.

History
A post office called Fountainbleau was established in 1875, and remained in operation until 1905. The community was named after the Palace of Fontainebleau, in France.

References

Unincorporated communities in Andrew County, Missouri
Unincorporated communities in Missouri